The Swan Glaciers are in the U.S. state of Montana. The glaciers are in the remote Bob Marshall Wilderness.

References

See also
 List of glaciers in the United States

Glaciers of Flathead County, Montana
Glaciers of Montana